Hagenow Stadt station is a station the German state of Mecklenburg-Vorpommern on the Hagenow Land–Bad Oldesloe railway, which is now largely disused or dismantled to the northwest of the station. It is located in the centre of Hagenow and was built in 1894 with the name of Hagenow, but it has been listed in the official timetables as Hagenow Stadt (town) since 2010. It consists of a small entrance building with catering facilities and, attached on its southern side, there is a long shed that used to serve freight operations. The main platform and another island platform are located on the two-track line. The entrance building is on the side of the line that faces towards the centre of town. Between Hagenow Stadt station and the point where the line towards Hagenow Land station becomes a single track, the tracks spread at two locations with four or five parallel sidings at each place, but they are no longer used. The entrance building and the freight terminal buildings are heritage-listed monuments.

Regular passenger  services, however, have only operated on the three and a half km section between Hagenow Land and Hagenow Stadt since the reactivation of the line in 2002. Currently, Hagenow Stadt station is served every two hours by the R14 service from Parchim and Ludwigslust, which is operated by Ostdeutsche Eisenbahn GmbH (ODEG).

References

Railway stations in Mecklenburg-Western Pomerania
Railway stations in Germany opened in 1894
Buildings and structures in Ludwigslust-Parchim